The 2023 season will be the Miami Dolphins' upcoming 54th season in the National Football League, their 58th overall, their eighth under general manager Chris Grier and their second under head coach Mike McDaniel.

After firing Josh Boyer, the Dolphins signed long time defensive coordinator Vic Fangio, who’s well known for his defense being consistently ranked top-5 in major categories. Fangio also became the highest paid defensive coordinator in the NFL.

The Dolphins will attempt to improve upon their 9–8 record from the previous two seasons, make the playoffs for the second consecutive season, and end their 14-year AFC East title drought.

Draft

Notes

Staff

Current roster

Preseason
The Dolphins' preseason opponents and schedule will be announced in the spring.

Regular season

2023 opponents
Listed below are the Dolphins' opponents for 2023. Exact dates and times will be announced in the spring.

References

External links
 

Miami
Miami Dolphins seasons
Miami Dolphins